In 2022, many dust storms have hit Iraq. One person has died and 5,000 people have been admitted to hospital. Flights from Baghdad and Najaf were grounded.

Orange skies and reduced visibility has been increasingly common in the country. Iraq's meteorological office says that the weather phenomenon is expected to become increasingly common "due to drought, desertification and declining rainfall". 23 May 2022, another sandstorm affected parts of Iraq, Syria and Iran.

References 

Dust storms
May 2022 events in Asia
Natural disasters in Iraq
2022 natural disasters
2022 in Iraq
Storms
2022 disasters in Iraq